The 1991 Italy rugby union tour of Namibia was a series of matches played between in June 1991 in Namibia by Italy national rugby union team to prepare the 1991 Rugby World Cup.

Results 
Scores and results list Italy's points tally first.

Bibliography 
  Valerio Vecchiarelli, Francesco Volpe, 2000, Italia in meta, GS editore, 2000.

  Memorias de la UAR 1989

1991 rugby union tours
1990–91 in Italian rugby union
1991
1991
1991 in African rugby union
rugby union